Frank Wiblishauser (born 18 October 1977) is a German former professional footballer who played as a central defender.

Career
Wiblishauser began his career with his hometown club, FC Memmingen, before joining the Youth Team of Bayern Munich in 1994. He was promoted to the reserve team a year later, and spent five years playing in the Regionalliga Süd. He was also a member of Bayern's first-team squad from 1996, but did not make a first-team appearance.  In 2000, he left for 1. FC Nürnberg, where he spent five years, and was involved in two promotions and two relegations between the 2. Bundesliga and the Bundesliga. His time there, though, was marred by injury and he was only able to make 76 appearances.

Wiblishauser left for Switzerland shortly after the beginning of the 2005–06 season, signing for FC St. Gallen. A year later he returned to Germany to sign for TuS Koblenz, where he stayed until being released in 2010, at which point his career ended.

References

External links
  
 

1977 births
Living people
German footballers
Germany under-21 international footballers
Germany youth international footballers
Association football defenders
FC Bayern Munich footballers
FC Bayern Munich II players
1. FC Nürnberg players
FC St. Gallen players
TuS Koblenz players
Bundesliga players
2. Bundesliga players
People from Memmingen
Sportspeople from Swabia (Bavaria)
Footballers from Bavaria